This is a table of notable people affiliated with Linfield University, formerly Linfield College. Some noted people are also listed in the main college article. Individuals are sorted by affiliation and alphabetized.

Alumni and former students

Entertainment 
 Reid Blackburn, American photographer killed in the 1980 eruption of Mount St. Helens in Washington
 Aparna Brielle, actress
 Jessie G, Nashville-based country singer/songwriter signed to Gretchen Wilson's "Redneck Records"
 Laura Gibson, musician
 Abigail Heringer, contestant on the 25th season of The Bachelor and Bachelor in Paradise. Heringer was the first hearing-impaired contestant on the show.
 Amy Tan, author of The Joy Luck Club, The Bonesetter's Daughter, and The Kitchen God's Wife
 Ryan Welch, owner and creative director of AO Films, and creator of documentary Alaskan Nets, which won awards at the Santa Barbara International Film Festival, Middlebury New Filmmakers Festival and Bend Film Festival.

Politics 
 Phillip Bond, U.S. Under Secretary of Commerce for Technology (2001-2005) and Chief of Staff to Commerce Secretary Don Evans (2002-2003)
 Joe Medicine Crow, Crow historian, last surviving Plains Indian war chief, and WWII veteran who received the Presidential Medal of Freedom
 Remy Drabkin, winemaker, creator of the Queer Wine Festival and mayor of McMinnville, Oregon

Sports 
 Roger Baker, member of the U.S. Olympic handball team in 1972 and 1976
 Scott David Brosius, former Major League Baseball third baseman for the Oakland Athletics (1991–1997) and the New York Yankees (1998–2001); 1998 World Series MVP
 Jennifer (Snook) Butcher, member of the U.S. Paralympic Swim Team, winning bronze at the 2000 and 2004 Paralympic Games
 Mark Few, basketball coach at Gonzaga University, assistant from 1989 to 1999 and head coach since 1999; attended Linfield before transferring to the University of Oregon, where he eventually earned his degree
 Randy Mueller, former general manager for the Miami Dolphins and New Orleans Saints, with over two decades of NFL front office experience; former sports analyst for ESPN
 Ad Rutschman, head football coach, baseball coach (1971-1983), and athletic director (1973-1996) of Linfield College; the only college coach at any level to have won national titles in both football and baseball; currently serves as kick-off return coach for the Linfield football team
 Sharon Shepherd, shot put and discus thrower who served as an alternate for the U.S. Track and Field Team in the 1960 Rome and 1964 Tokyo Olympic Games
 Fred von Appen, retired football coach known for his head coaching stint with the University of Hawaii at Mānoa from 1996–1998 and for serving as an assistant coach on a number of NFL and college coaching staffs

Business, law, and medical 

 Jessica (Saling) Gill, leading researcher on traumatic brain injuries and professor at Johns Hopkins School of Medicine. Elected to the National Academy of Medicine in October 2021.
 Augustus C. Kinney, longtime physician in Astoria, Oregon, and noted expert on tuberculosis at the turn of the 20th century
 Susie Kuhn, president of Foot Locker's Europe, Middle East and Africa operations and general manager for Foot Locker Europe
 Thomas Allen McBride, 20th Chief Justice of the Oregon Supreme Court, serving three times as chief between 1913 and 1927; overall, he served on Oregon's highest court from 1909 till his death in 1930
 William Marion Ramsey, 43rd Associate Justice of the Oregon Supreme Court in the United States from 1913–1915; first dean of Willamette University College of Law; mayor of Salem, Oregon and McMinnville, Oregon

Education 
 Raymond Culver, fourth president of Shimer College
 Lorie A. Fridell, an American criminologist known for her research on police and racial profiling and associate professor at the University of South Florida
 Kenneth Scott Latourette, professor emeritus at Yale University and eminent scholar of Christianity and Chinese history
 Daniel O'Leary, organic chemist at Pomona College
 Raemer Schreiber, experimental physicist who worked on the Manhattan Project and helped develop the atom and hydrogen bomb

Employees (current and former)

Current 
 Alyssa Lampe, assistant wrestling coach at Linfield University and two-time World Cup bronze medalist 
 Andrea Reinkemeyer, award-winning composer and professor of music
 Joe Wilkins, author of Fall Back Down When I Die, The Mountain and the Fathers, and four poetry collections

Former 
 John Wesley Johnson, professor at Linfield from 1863 to 1867 and later president of the University of Oregon
 Jane McIlroy, Linfield professor and athletic director for 32 years who was recognized as the first woman in the United States to govern a college athletic program by the Association of Intercollegiate Athletics for Women in 1982
 Lynwood W. Swanson, professor of chemistry and academic dean 1968-73, co-founder and chairman (1987-2002) of FEI Company

Other notable people 
 Edith Green, U.S. Representative, serving 10 terms from 1955-1974 and authored Title IX. Green served on the Linfield College Board of Trustees and received an honorary degree from the college in 1964.
 Albin Walter Norblad, Jr., served in the Oregon Legislative Assembly as a representative for one term (1935–1937); member of the board of trustees of Linfield College

College and university presidents (1857-present)

Presidents of McMinnville College
 1857-60: George C. Chandler
 1864-67: John W. Johnson
 1873: J. D. Robb
 1873-76: Mark Bailey
 1876-77: John E. Magers
 1877-78: Ep Roberts
 1878-81: J. G. Burchett
 1881-87: E.C. Anderson
 1887-96: Truman G. Brownson
 1896-1903: Harry L. Boardman
 1903-05: A. M. Brumback
 1905-06: Emanuel Northup, interim
 1906-31: Leonard W. Riley (name changed to Linfield in 1922)

Presidents of Linfield College
 1931-32: William R. Frerichs, interim
 1932-38: Elam J. Anderson
 1938-43: William G. Everson
 1943-68: Harry L. Dillin
 1968, 1974: Winthrop W. Dolan, interim
 1968-74: Gordon C. Bjork
 1974-75: Cornelius Siemens, interim
 1975-92: Charles U. Walker
 1992-2005: Vivian A. Bull
 2005-06: Marvin Henberg, interim
 2006–2018: Thomas L. Hellie
 2018-2020: Miles K. Davis (College changed to University in 2020)

Presidents of Linfield University
 2020-present: Miles K. Davis

Notes

References 
 Fall 2007 Linfield Magazine

 
Linfield University alumni